Stanko Perpar (born 1899, date of death unknown) was a Yugoslav sprinter. He competed in the men's 200 metres at the 1924 Summer Olympics.

References

External links
 

1899 births
Year of death missing
Athletes (track and field) at the 1924 Summer Olympics
Yugoslav male sprinters
Olympic athletes of Yugoslavia
Place of birth missing